Minute by Minute is the eighth studio album by American rock band The Doobie Brothers, released on December 1, 1978, by Warner Bros. Records. It was their last album to include members John Hartman (until Cycles) and Jeff "Skunk" Baxter.

The album spent 87 weeks on the Billboard 200 chart. In the spring of 1979 Minute by Minute was the best-selling album in the U.S. for five non-consecutive weeks. It was certified 3× Platinum by the RIAA.

The song "What a Fool Believes" hit No. 1 on the Billboard Hot 100 in April 1979 and became the band's biggest hit. The title track and "Depending on You" were also released as singles and reached the top 30.

Minute by Minute made The Doobie Brothers one of the big winners at the 22nd Grammy Awards. The album got the trophy for Best Pop Vocal Performance by a Duo or Group and received a  nomination for Album of the Year; the single "What a Fool Believes" earned them three Grammys, including Song and Record of the Year.

Track listing

Personnel

The Doobie Brothers
Patrick Simmons – lead and rhythm guitars, lead and backing vocals
Michael McDonald – piano, electric piano, organ, synthesizers, lead and backing vocals
Jeff "Skunk" Baxter – lead and rhythm guitars
Tiran Porter – bass, backing vocals
John Hartman – drums, percussion
Keith Knudsen – drums, percussion, backing vocals

Additional musicians
Ted Templeman – drums (with Keith Knudsen) on "What a Fool Believes", additional percussion
Bobby LaKind – congas, backing vocals
Tom Johnston – backing vocals on "Don't Stop to Watch the Wheels"
Nicolette Larson – duet vocals on "Sweet Feelin'", backing vocals on "Dependin' on You"
Rosemary Butler – backing vocals on "Here to Love You" and "Dependin' on You"
Norton Buffalo – harmonica on "Don't Stop to Watch the Wheels" and "Steamer Lane Breakdown"
Herb Pedersen – banjo on "Steamer Lane Breakdown"
Byron Berline – fiddle on "Steamer Lane Breakdown"
Lester Abrams – electric piano on "How Do the Fools Survive?"
Bill Payne – synthesizer (with Michael McDonald) on "What a Fool Believes" and "Minute by Minute"
Novi Novog – synthesizer solo on "Open Your Eyes"
Sumner Mering – guitar on "Open Your Eyes"
Andrew Love – saxophone on "Here to Love You", "Dependin' on You" and "How Do the Fools Survive?"
Ben Cauley – trumpet on "Here to Love You", "Dependin' on You" and "How Do the Fools Survive?"

Production
Producer – Ted Templeman
Production Coordination – Beth Naranjo
Engineer – Donn Landee
Additional Engineer – Loyd Clifft
Additional Engineer - Steve Malcolm
Cover Design and Coordinator – Bruce Steinberg
Photography – David Alexander
Management – Bruce Cohn

Recorded at Warner Bros. Recording Studios, North Hollywood;
Mixed at Sunset Sound, Los Angeles

Charts

Weekly charts

Year-end charts

Certifications

References

1978 albums
The Doobie Brothers albums
Warner Records albums
Albums produced by Ted Templeman
Albums recorded at Sunset Sound Recorders